Proverbaro Esperanta ("Esperanto Proverbs") is a book of proverbs in Esperanto. It was arranged by L. L. Zamenhof according to a book of his father Mark Zamenhof (Frazeologio Russian-Polish-French-German). It contains 2630 proverbs.

The first edition was published in 1910. There are also editions of 1925, 1961 (Stafeto), 1974 (Stafeto) and 1990 (published in China).

References

External links 
Text of Proverbaro Esperanta (in Esperanto language):
 
 
 Proverbaro Esperanta at Lernu.net (Internet Archive Copy)
 Proverbaro Esperanta (pdf) (Internet Archive copy)
 Proverbaro Esperanta
 Esperantaj proverboj (Webpage of Rob Keetlaer)
	

Other links:
 Proverbaro Esperanta in the book-service of UEA (in Esperanto)
 Discussion about the Proverbaro in linguistic forum (in Russian) (Internet Archive copy)

Esperanto literature
1910 non-fiction books